Faith Jefferies (born August 5, 1999) is an American professional wrestler, taekwondo practitioner, and musician. She is currently signed to WWE, where she performs on its NXT brand under the ring name Nikkita Lyons. Jefferies has also wrestled for Women of Wrestling (WOW) as Faith the Lioness.

Early life
Jefferies was born in Las Vegas, Nevada and raised in Hollywood, California. She began practicing Taekwondo at the age of four, earning a black belt by the age of 8. She graduated from high school in early 2017.

Professional wrestling career

Women of Wrestling (2019–2021)
Shortly after graduating high school in 2018, Jefferies began professional wrestling training under Selina Majors. She debuted for Women of Wrestling under the ring name "Faith The Lioness". In summer 2021, Jefferies attended WWE's tryouts in Las Vegas, where she was offered a developmental contract.

WWE

NXT (2021–present)
After signing with WWE in late summer 2021, Jefferies' WWE debut was on the December 31, 2021 episode of 205 Live, under the ring name Nikkita Lyons, losing to Amari Miller. She made her NXT debut on the February 22, 2022 episode, defeating Kayla Inlay. In April, Lyons entered into a feud with Lash Legend, beating her on the April 5 and 26 episodes of NXT respectively. At Spring Breakin', she teamed with Cora Jade to defeat Legend and Natalya in a tag team match. On the May 10 episode of NXT, Lyons participated in the NXT Women's Breakout Tournament, defeating Arianna Grace in the first round. On May 24, it was announced that Lyons was removed from the tournament due to an injury, revealing on her Instagram account a day later that she suffered a partial MCL tear and an MCL sprain. Lyons returned on the June 28 episode of NXT, defeating NXT Women's Champion Mandy Rose by disqualification.

On the July 19 episode of NXT, Lyons competed in a 20-woman battle royal to determine the number one contender for the NXT Women's Championship, eliminating Kayden Carter and Kiana James, but was eliminated by Tiffany Stratton. On the August 8 episode of Raw, it was announced that Lyons would be teaming with Zoey Stark in a tournament to fill the WWE Women's Tag Team Championship that had been vacant since May. On the August 19 episode  of SmackDown, Lyons and her tag partner were removed from the tournament. Stark reportedly sustained a concussion days earlier in an NXT Women's Championship match. It was soon also reported that WWE had pulled Jefferies from the tournament because Canada, where the first round matches would take place, didn't allow unvaccinated (COVID-19) foreigners into the country. On September 13 at the NXT 2.0 One Year Anniversary Show, Lyons and Stark defeated James and Arianna Grace. On the November 8 episode of NXT, Lyons and Stark failed to capture the NXT Women's Tag Team Championship from Carter and Katana Chance, and Lyons was taken out by Stark after the match. Lyons lost to Stark on the December 20 episode of NXT and was injured on the January 24 episode of NXT.

References

External links 
 
 
 Faith Jefferies at Apple Music
 

1999 births
American female professional wrestlers
American female taekwondo practitioners
Living people
Sportspeople from Las Vegas
Professional wrestlers from Nevada
21st-century professional wrestlers